Alone/Together is a 2019 Filipino romantic drama film written and directed by Antoinette Jadaone, starring Liza Soberano and Enrique Gil. It follows the love story of Christine (Soberano) and Raf (Gil), who cross paths again five years after they broke up. The film was released by Star Cinema on February 13, 2019.

Plot

The film begins with Christine "Tin" Lazaro (Liza Soberano), a University of the Philippines Art Studies major and a part-time museum guide, touring high school students in The National Museum of the Philippines. During one of her tours, she meets Rafael "Raf" Toledo (Enrique Gil), a University of Santo Tomas - Biology student, and an avid fan of The Eraserheads. They first find themselves in a little clash debating the comparison of the museum's famous painting, and Raf's favorite song Spoliarium. First at odds, they soon begin dating and eventually enter into a romantic relationship. Raf dreams of becoming a doctor while Tin aspires to be a museum director. She also dreams to visit The MET (Metropolitan Museum of Art) and other museums in New York. But their relationship falls apart when Tin is accused of allowing her boss to steal from the company. She was saved by Gregory "Greg" Fausto (Luis Alandy), a coworker who likes her and believes that she is innocent. Owing to the extremely stressful situation, she breaks up with Raf when, much to her chagrin, Raf is not able to graduate again, and is still stuck at preparatory medicine school. Raf initially proposes to Tin, to avoid losing her, but Tin refuses the proposal, and break up with Raf.

Five years later, Tin is now in a relationship with Greg. She accompanies her boyfriend at the PICC for an awarding ceremony. There, she also sees Raf who is now a doctor, also receiving an award. Raf sees Tin and meets her at the hallway of the complex, asking her if they can see each other sometime. When the two meet again at the "their place", Tin finally tells him about what happened five years before. Their time is interrupted when Raf receives a call from the hospital, needing his immediate presence. Tin accompanies him, and sees Raf working diligently and passionately at the hospital. While there, Raf introduces Tin to Aly (Jasmine Curtis-Smith), a fellow doctor and his current girlfriend.

Tin is currently working for Greg's company, and is well-loved by her subordinates. She performs her job very diligently, but she does not feel respected and recognized by Greg. There's an opportunity at her place of work to travel to New York. Raf, cognizant of her dream to visit the museums there, convinces her to volunteer for the work trip. Greg gives her the opportunity, and she performs well.  Finishing the objective of her trip on time, Tin pleads with Greg to let her stay a few more days to be able to visit the museums. Greg initially refuses, but she persists, earning his permission to stay a few days. Unbeknownst to Tin, Raf purchased a ticket flight to New York to join her and fulfill their dreams to visit The MET and other museums. Raf reveals that he broke up with Aly and wants to marry Tin. She sadly rejects his engagement, stating that she would hurt Greg and his daughter Aisha (Xia Vigor) if she marries him. This leads to an argument, and Tin walks away from Raf.

Upon returning to the Philippines, Tin realizes that she really isn't happy with her current life, and breaks up with Greg. She seeks Raf to tell him of her decision but he reveals that Aly is pregnant with Raf's child. After talking and getting advice from her former college professor, Alwyn (Nonie Buencamino), Tin rebuilds her life in the field she has always wanted to pursue. At first, her past mistake continues to hinder her job applications from being accepted, the art community being small. But she eventually lands a job in a local museum. She later visits Raf at the hospital, and finally apologizes to him for being a coward and selfish. Raf apologizes too, for his rash behavior the last time they saw each other. He also reveals that his relationship with Aly did not work out. Before the conversation could go any further, he gets called in again. Tin tells him the she still loves him.

Tin continues to work rebuilding her life. She goes back to the National Museum to attend an awarding of up and coming artists, which included Alex, a Filipina artist turned car dealer that she met when she was visiting museums in New York. In her speech, Alex thanked Tin for making her realize that there is life for her in the Philippines as an artist, and concluded that even art is often seen as a form of self-expression, it should always serve the people they belong to. Alex ended her speech by inviting Tin to the stage and be recognized, and the two shared a hug. As Tin leaves the museum after the ceremony, happy, she finds Raf waiting for her. The film ends with Tin and Raf and Raf's son, looking at Juan Luna's Spoliarium bringing their story full circle.

Cast

 Liza Soberano as Christine "Tin" M. Lazaro, a Magna Cum Laude graduate from the BA Art Studies Program of UP Diliman, and dreams of becoming a museum director at renowned attractions like "The Met" and "The Louvre".
 Enrique Gil as Rafael "Raf" F. Toledo, a BS Biology student from the University of Santo Tomas whose goal is only to graduate.
 Jasmine Curtis-Smith as Aly, an ER intern and Raf's current girlfriend.
 Sylvia Sanchez as Hilda M. Lazaro, Tin's mom
 Nonie Buencamino as Sir Alwyn, Tin's professor and mentor during her college years.
 Adrian Alandy as Gregory "Greg" Fausto, Tin's boss and boyfriend.
 Xia Vigor as Aisha Fausto, Greg's daughter from his previous relationship.

Reception

Box office
Black Sheep announced that Alone/Together raked in a total of P21,672,901.58 on its opening day. The figures increased in more than P123 million in 4 days. The film crossed over the ₱200 million mark in 9 days. The film earned P350 million on its fourth week. As of June 2019, the filmed grossed P370 million worldwide.

Critical response
Oggs Cruz, writing for Rappler, reviewed the film thus,  “Alone/Together” is a film that is clearly within the genre that aspires for escape from the real world. However, it actually treads that real world, looking, with the help of Neil Daza’s precise lensing, more forlorn and palpable than just pretty and glossy. The conspiracy between the mechanics of a romance and palatable realness is strange at first, until it all makes beautiful sense. He praised Soberano as a formidable performer, an actress who can go beyond innate charisma to draw her audience into her character’s plight. In a gesture that is very mature, Gil generously grants Soberano the spotlight, allowing his character to stay as a support.

Je CC from Lion hear tv wrote “Alone/Together’, is liberal; its haunting illustration of a highly vulnerable love affair, tried under the curbs of time and personal differences. There is a consummate lens through which the film’s themes are dissected. The idea of people striving to make their romance work amid their individual pursuit of their respective dreams and wants, is treated with a grounded sensibility that gives Alone/Together, a distinctive character, cognizant of its need to be more than the conventions from its mainstream contemporaries that tend to fully embrace.

Pablo Tariman of The Philippine Star gave the film generally positive reviews and praised Soberano stating “you see a different Liza in the role that she has immersed into with quiet but smoldering result. The eyes speak a lot. This is Liza at her best without turning to the kilig factor as her savior. She invests her role with quiet intensity between love and disgust and personal confusion. This is acting so well-defined and away from the demands of inane love teams.”

Release
The film premiered on cinemas in the Philippines on February 13, 2019. Alone/Together started its international screenings in the month of February in Taiwan, United Arab Emirates, Bahrain, Oman, Papua New Guinea, Qatar, Canada, Fiji, Austria, UK, Sweden, Spain, Ireland, Italy, Australia, Brunei, and New Zealand. On March 1, 2 and 3, the film premiered in Israel, Italy, Northern Mariana Islands, Finland, Cyprus, Denmark, France, Greece, Italy, and Malta. On April 4, the film premiered in Saudi Arabia.

The film was also showcased during ASEAN Cinema Week 2019 in Busan and Seoul, South Korea from November to December. It also had a regular screening in Cambodia in January 2020.

The film was made available for streaming on Netflix in the Philippines starting November 5, 2020.

Awards and nominations

References

External links
 
 

2019 films
Philippine romantic drama films
2019 romantic drama films
Films directed by Antoinette Jadaone